The Revised English Bible (REB) is a 1989 English-language translation of the Bible that updates the New English Bible (NEB) of 1970. As with its predecessor, it is published by the publishing houses of both the universities of Oxford and Cambridge. It is not to be confused with the Revised English Bible of 1877, which was an annotated and slightly emended King James Bible.

Translation philosophy
The REB is the result of both advances in scholarship and translation made since the 1960s and also a desire to correct what have been seen as some of the NEB's more egregious errors (for examples of changes, see the references). The changes remove many of the most idiosyncratic renderings of the NEB, moving the REB more in the direction of standard translations such as the New Revised Standard Version (NRSV) or the New International Version (NIV).

The translation is intended to take account of gender-inclusive usage, though not to the same extent as translations such as the NRSV. Psalm 1 offers an illustration of the REB's middle-ground approach to gender-inclusive language. On one side are more literal translations, such as the King James Version (KJV), Revised Standard Version (RSV), and the English Standard Version (ESV), that use the word "man" and the masculine singular pronoun in Psalm 1. The RSV/ESV, for example, read "Blessed is the man who walks not in the counsel of the wicked...; but his delight is in the law of the Lord." On the other side are more dynamic translations aiming for gender-inclusivity, such as the NRSV, that avoid exclusively masculine English nouns and pronouns. For instance, in Psalm 1, the NRSV uses plurals: "Happy are those who do not follow the advice of the wicked...; but their delight is in the law of the Lord." By comparison, the REB walks a middle path between both approaches. In Psalm 1, the REB avoids using a male noun ("man") while also retaining the masculine singular pronouns ("his"): "Happy is the one who does not take the counsel of the wicked for a guide... His delight is in the law of the Lord."

The style of the REB has been described as more "literary" than that of the NRSV or NIV. It tends slightly further in the direction of "dynamic equivalence" than those translations, but still translates Hebrew poetry as poetry and reflects at least some of the characteristics of that poetry. The REB's general accuracy and literary flavour have led Stephen Mitchell and others to praise it as one of the best English language renderings. The translators of the REB gave particular attention to its suitability for public reading, especially in the Book of Psalms.

According to the American Bible Society, the NEB had a "considerable British [flavour]" but the REB "removed much of this distinctiveness and aimed to be more accessible to an international audience".

Churches in the Anglican Communion in which the REB is authorised for liturgical use include the:
Episcopal Church,
Church of England, 
Anglican Church of Canada.

Sponsors 

The churches and other Christian groups that sponsored the REB were:

 Baptist Union of Great Britain
 Bible Society
 Church of England
 Church of Scotland
 Council of Churches for Wales
 Irish Council of Churches
 The London Yearly Meeting of the Religious Society of Friends
 Methodist Church of Great Britain
 Moravian Church in Great Britain and Ireland
 National Bible Society of Scotland
 Roman Catholic Church in England and Wales
 Roman Catholic Church in Ireland
 Roman Catholic Church in Scotland
 Salvation Army
 United Reformed Church

Revision committee members 
Chairman of the joint committee responsible for translation: Donald Coggan

Director of revision: William Duff McHardy

Revisers: G. W. Anderson; R. S. Barbour; I. P. M. Brayley; M. Brewster; S. P. Brock; G. B. Caird; P. Ellingworth; R. P. Gordon; M. D. Hooker; A. A. Macintosh; W. McKane; I. H. Marshall; R. A. Mason; I. Moir; R. Murray; E. W. Nicholson; C. H. Roberts; R. B. Salters; P. C. H. Wernberg-Moller; M. F. Wiles

Literary advisers: M. H. Black; M. Caird; J. K. Cordy, Baroness de Ward; I. Gray; P. Larkin; Doris Martin; C. H. Roberts; Sir Richard Southern; P. J. Spicer; J. I. M. Stewart; Mary Stewart

References

Footnotes

Notes

Bibliography

Further reading

External links 
 

1989 books
1989 in Christianity
Bible translations into English